Joseph Striker (December 23, 1898 – February 24, 1974) was an American actor. He appeared in 28 films between 1920 and 1929. Later in the 1930s he appeared on Broadway.

He was born in New York City. A resident of Cranford, New Jersey, Striker died at St. Barnabas Hospital in Livingston, New Jersey on February 24, 1974.

Partial filmography

 The Unseen Witness (1920) - Harry Gray
 The Bromley Case (1920) - Bruce Bromley
 The Scrap of Paper (1920) - Harry Gray
 The Wall Street Mystery (1920) - Tom Williams
 Help Yourself (1920) - Oliver Browning
 The Matrimonial Web (1921) - Harvey Blake
 The Broadway Peacock (1922) - Harold Van Tassel
 Silver Wings (1922) - Harry (play)
 Queen of the Moulin Rouge (1922) - Tom Richards
 Wildness of Youth (1922) - Andrew Kane
 What Fools Men Are (1922) - Ralph Demarest
 The Woman in Chains (1922) - Jacques Despard
 The Steadfast Heart (1923) - Angus Burke
 Painted People (1924) - Preston Dutton
 I Am the Man (1924) - Billy Gray
 Daughters Who Pay (1925) - Larry Smith
 Scandal Proof (1925) - Dick Thorbeck
 The Best People (1925) - Bertie Lenox
 The King of Kings (1927) - John - the Beloved
 The Climbers (1927) - Ensign Carlos
 Annie Laurie (1927) - Alastair
 Cradle Snatchers (1927) - Joe Valley
 A Harp in Hock (1927) - Dr. Franz Mueller
 The Wise Wife (1927) - Carter Fairfax
 Paradise (1928) - Dr. John Halliday
 The House of Secrets (1929) - Barry Wilding
 The Wrecker (1929) - Roger Doyle

References

External links

 young Joseph Striker in the 1922 Silver Wings with Mary Carr and Percy Helton (Univ. of Washington, Sayre collection)

1898 births
1974 deaths
American male film actors
American male silent film actors
People from Cranford, New Jersey
Male actors from New Jersey
20th-century American male actors